The 1869 Stafford by-election was fought on 7 June 1869. The by-election was fought due to the Void election of the incumbent MP of the Conservative Party, Walter Meller.  It was won by the Conservative candidate Thomas Salt.

References

Stafford
1869 elections in the United Kingdom
1869 in England
By-elections to the Parliament of the United Kingdom in Staffordshire constituencies
19th century in Staffordshire
June 1869 events